Argimiro España (1906 – March 1995) was a Spanish painter. He was born in Fresno de la Fuente, Segovia and was known for his individualistic style. He made oil paintings on sackcloth.

References
Mention of Argimiro España's death

Spanish painters
1906 births
1995 deaths